McIlwaine is a surname. Notable people with the surname include:

Ellen McIlwaine (1945–2021), American singer-songwriter and musician
Garry McIlwaine (born 1944), Australian politician
George Arthren McIlwaine (–1930), South African rugby union player
Henry Read McIlwaine (1864–1934), American librarian
Johnny McIlwaine (1904–1980), Scottish footballer
Richard McIlwaine (born 1950), English cricketer
Richard McIlwaine (educator) (1835–1913), American theologian and college president
Robert McIlwaine (1924–2015), American lawyer and public official

See also
McIlwaine House, a historic house in Petersburg, Virginia, United States